The Second Wirth cabinet (German: Zweites Kabinett Wirth) was the sixth democratically elected Reichsregierung of the German Reich, during the period in which it is now usually referred to as the Weimar Republic. The cabinet was named after Reichskanzler (chancellor) Joseph Wirth and took office on 26 October 1921 when it replaced the First Wirth cabinet.

The cabinet was based on a coalition of Social Democratic Party of Germany (SPD) and the Catholic Zentrum. The DDP supported it and its Reichswehrminister Otto Gessler remained in office, to be later joined by industrialist Walther Rathenau.

The Second Wirth cabinet resigned on 14 November 1922 and was replaced on 22 November by the Cuno cabinet.

Establishment
Wirth's first government resigned on 22 October 1921 in protest over the partitioning of Upper Silesia decided on by the League of Nations which gave rise to what became known as the Genfer Ultimatum (the "Geneva Ultimatum"). President Friedrich Ebert asked Wirth to form a new cabinet on 25 October. Ebert noted that attempts to form a "grand coalition", i.e. including the DDP and/or the German People's Party (DVP) on 23 to 25 October seemed to have failed. Both of these parties had refused to support acceptance of the Geneva ultimatum and to join any coalition that agreed to it. SPD and Zentrum now decided to form a government, but on 26 October, Wirth gave a government statement in which he presented his new cabinet as a combination of individuals, not as members of a coalition. Wiederaufbau was left vacant. Wirth was in charge of the Foreign Office and Andreas Hermes became acting Finance Minister. This left positions to divide in case of a later increase in the size of the coalition. Otto Gessler remained in office as an individual, not a representative of his party.

Hopes to add the DVP to the government were disappointed, however, after Wirth incensed them by appointing Rathenau as Foreign Minister at the end of January. With Hermes becoming Finance Minister and Fehr replacing him at Ernährung in March 1922, there was just Wiederaufbau left as a potential prize for an additional party.

Overview of the members
The members of the cabinet were as follows:

Notes:  in addition to his role as Ernährungsminister Hermes was acting Minister of Finance until officially appointed to Finance in early March 1922. He then gave up the former position on either 10 or 31 March, when he was succeeded by Fehr. The post of Foreign Minister was held by Wirth until 1 February 1922 when Rathenau took over at the Auswärtiges Amt (AA). Rathenau was assassinated in office on 24 June and Wirth once again resumed the duties at the AA. The position of Reichsminister für Wiederaufbau was left vacant throughout the cabinet's tenure.

Resignation
On 24 September 1922, the "Majority" SPD and the Independent Social Democratic Party of Germany (USDP) merged, thus boosting the SPD's number of seats in the Reichstag. Nevertheless, in October the "bourgeois" parties joined together to outvote the strongest party, the SPD, on the issue of the Getreideumlage (agricultural policy). On 14 November 1922, Vice-Chancellor Bauer announced that the SPD refused to agree to include the DVP in the coalition as desired by Zentrum and DDP. As a result, the cabinet resigned and was replaced on 22 November 1922 by the Cuno cabinet, a Kabinett der Persönlichkeiten ("cabinet of personages").

References

Wirth II
Wirth II
1921 establishments in Germany
Cabinets established in 1921
Cabinets disestablished in 1922